Phaeodepas is a genus of fungus in the family Marasmiaceae. The genus contains two species found in Venezuela.

See also
List of Marasmiaceae genera

References

Marasmiaceae
Agaricales genera